The 1976 Missouri lieutenant gubernatorial election was held on November 2, 1976. Incumbent Republican Bill Phelps defeated Democratic nominee Richard J. Rabbitt with 50.0% of the vote.

Primary elections 
Primary elections were held on August 3, 1976.

Democratic primary

Candidates 
 Richard J. Rabbitt, Speaker of the Missouri House of Representatives
 John C. McAllister
 Alberta Slavin
 Leonard L. Bade

Results

General election

Candidates 
Major party candidates
 Bill Phelps, Republican
 Richard J. Rabbitt, Democratic

Other candidates
 Leo J. Fischer, Nonpartisan

Results

References 

1976
Gubernatorial
Missouri